Ninochka Manoug Kupelian (born November 14, 1946 in Cairo), better known by her stage name Lebleba (also Lubluba), is an Egyptian film actress and entertainer. She is the cousin of both Egyptian actress Feyrouz and entertainer Nelly.

She was born in Cairo to an Egyptian family of Armenian Christian background. She started as a child actress imitating other actresses, including appearances on the Egyptian National Theater promoted by Muallem Sadiq. She was given her first movie role through Egyptian film director and producer Anwar Wagdi and screenwriter / playwright Abo El Seoud El Ebiary in Habeebti Sousou. El Ebiary also chose the name Lebleba after seeing the multi-talented child actress, comedian, dancer and singer Ninochka Kupelian. In the 1970s, she acted alongside leading man Salah Zulfikar in Borj El-Athraa (1970) and Fi Saif Lazim Nohib (1974). She married actor Hassan Youssef, but they divorced. She never remarried.

Filmography 

 Esabet Hamada We Tootoo
 Al Beit Al Said
 Kadi Gharam
 Rehla Shahr Al Asal
 Habibti Soo Soo
 Arba3 Banat We Zabet
 Borj El-Athraa
 Al Nagham Al Hazeen
 Al Milionair AL Mouzayaf
 AL Habib AL Maghool
 Agaza Bel Afia
 Bent Badi3a
 Al BAnat Wel Hob
 Al Banat Wel Marcedes
 Al Sokareya
 Ya Zalemni
 Shei2 Men Al Hob
 Aris AL Hana
 Ehtares Men Al Regal Ya Mama
 Hekayti Maa Al Zaman
 Fi El Seif Lazem Neheb
 Emraa Bala 2Alb
 Hob Fo2 Al Bourkan
 Al Sheyateen Fi Agaza
 3aga2eb Ya Zaman
 24 Sa3a Hob
 Mouled Ya Donia
 AL Kadeia Al Mashhoura
 Bezour Al Sheytan
 Al Hesab Ya Madmouazel
 Bos Shouf Sokar Beta3mel Eih
 Ragol Fi Segn Al Nesa2
 Moughameroon Hawl Al 3alam
 Eli Dehek Ala Al Sheytan
 Al Gana Taht Kadamayha
 AL Ba3d Yazhab Lel Ma2zoun Maratein
 Arba3a Etnin Arba3a 4-2-4
 Setouhi Fawk Al Shagara
 AL Kadab We shabou
 Ehtares Men Al Khot
 Lahib El Entekam
 Ehna Betou3 AL Esa3af
 Al Mokhber
 Emraa Taht El Ekhtebar
 Enohom Yasrekoun Al Araneb
 Lak Youm Ya Beih
 Mehatet LA Ens
 Awlad El Esoul
 Giran Akher Zaman
 Sheytan Men 3asal
 Bokra Ahla Men Al Neharda
 Al Sheytana Alati Ahabatni
 Leyla Sakhena
 Ded Al Hekouma
 Ganat Al Shayateen
 Al Akhar
 Al Na3ama Wel Tawous
Ma'ali al Wazir
 Booha
 3Aris Men Geha Amneya
 Wesh Egram
 Eskenderia New York
 Hassan wa Morcus
 Nathariat Amti
 Al Fil Al Azraq
 Villa 69

External links 
 

Egyptian film actresses
Egyptian Christians
Egyptian people of Armenian descent
1946 births
Living people
Actresses from Cairo